The XII Corps, also known as Quetta Corps is a corps of the Pakistan Army currently stationed in Quetta, Balochistan Province.

History
The Soviet invasion of Afghanistan in 1979 created for Pakistan a real security threat on the western borders for the first time in its history. As a result, two new corps were raised to guard the western borders. These were the XI Corps in Peshawar, and the XII Corps, with the responsibility of guarding the Bolan Pass. The formation spent the first few years of its history guarding against Soviet expansionism. The end of the Cold War and the ending of the Soviet threat led the formation into a new era. It would lose divisions and brigades to the western border. Notably, 40 infantry division would be moved to Okara

War on Terrorism
The war on terror began and once again the corps began to undertake duty on the western borders, catching and neutralising Al-Qaeda and Taliban operatives, although it has not been involved to such an extent as the XI Corps. The operations continue to this day.

2001–2002 Standoff
The formation would in early 2002 be moved to the eastern border for the first time in its history as the threat of war with India loomed. The corps' purpose was to provide reinforcement to V Corps in the Thar desert. It would return to Quetta in 2004 just in time to face a new challenge.

Baloch Rebellion
In 2004, the Balochistan conflict restarted. The formation was involved in putting down the insurrection in collaboration with local security forces, and by 2006, with the killing of Akbar Bugti, the rebellion was more or less suppressed.

Structure
The formations composition has changed on several occasions in the past, and like all formations on the western border it has received reinforcements for the War on Terror. However, its present composition is thought to be:

List of Commanders XII Corps

See also 

 2022 Pakistan Army helicopter incident

References

Corps of the Pakistan Army
Military units and formations established in 1984
Military in Balochistan, Pakistan